Robert Turner (1877 – unknown) was an English footballer. His regular position was at full-back. He was born in Manchester.

He played for Manchester United, making two Football League appearances in the 1898-1899 season, when the club was known as Newton Heath F.C.

He also played for Red Rock, Gravesend United, Brighton United and Cray Wanderers.

Whilst at Cray, he was part of the side that won the 1901-1902 Kent League Championship, scoring four goals during the season.

References

External links
MUFCInfo.com profile

1877 births
English footballers
Manchester United F.C. players
Year of death missing
Cray Wanderers F.C. players
Association football fullbacks
Kent Football League (1894–1959) players